StocksQuest was a website hosted by the University of Georgia, that provided a free stock market simulator tool.  On the website, players were able to purchase stocks using virtual currency and compete against others to profit the most.

The website was a popular teaching tool used by educators to expose students to realistic stock market scenarios, as StocksQuest used real stock trading data by synchronizing its data with that of Yahoo! Finance. Lesson plans and basic investing resources were also available free of charge.

On January 2, 2009, the site was not available due to lack of personnel to maintain participant information.
As of late November 2010, the site has been offline and the server is out of order. StocksQuest has been shut down and will not return.

References

University of Georgia
Stock market
Financial markets software
Simulation software